Robert Owen (born 23 September 1984) is a Welsh professional darts player who plays in Professional Darts Corporation (PDC) events. He was a British Classic Champion.

Career
Owen reached the Quarter Finals of the 2017 Dutch Darts Masters after defeating Jamie Bain, Cristo Reyes and Simon Whitlock, but was narrowly defeated in 6-5 by Michael Smith.

He made his televised debut at the 2017 Players Championship Finals, but was defeated 6-2 by top seed Rob Cross.

Owen qualified for the 2018 UK Open, where starting at the Second Round stage, he defeated Michael Burgoine, Jamie Lewis, Nathan Rafferty, Ian White and John Part to reach the semifinals in only his second televised event, but was defeated by Corey Cadby.

World Championship results

PDC
 2023: First round (lost to Andrew Gilding 2–3)

WDF
 2023:

References

External links

1984 births
Living people
Welsh darts players
Sportspeople from Bridgend
Professional Darts Corporation current tour card holders